KNEB-FM (94.1 MHz) is a radio station  broadcasting a country music format. Licensed to Scottsbluff, Nebraska, United States, the station serves the Scottsbluff area. The station is owned by Nebraska Rural Radio Association and features programming from ABC Radio and Westwood One.

KNEB-HD2
On July 12, 2018, KNEB-FM launched a classic country format on its HD2 subchannel, branded as "101.7 The Trail" (formerly simulcast on translator K269DO 101.7 FM Scottsbluff).

References

External links

Country radio stations in the United States
NEB-FM